Tiit Nuudi (born 22 October 1949 in Tallinn) is an Estonian politician and former tennis player.

1988–1990, he was Minister of the Environment.

References

Living people
1949 births
Government ministers of Estonia
Estonian male tennis players
Estonian tennis coaches
Tallinn University of Technology alumni
Sportspeople from Tallinn